Black Bastards Ruffs + Rares is an EP containing rare and demo tracks by KMD from the album Black Bastards. It was released in 1998 on Fondle 'Em Records, available on 12" vinyl only. The EP contains eight tracks in total, four of which are instrumental.

Track listing

Credits 

Credits are adapted from the EP's label.
 Chris Scott - mastering
Subroc - producer 
Zev - co-producer , producer

References

MF Doom albums
1998 debut EPs